Kaliveedu is an Indian Malayalam-language soap opera directed by Dileep Kumar. The show premiered on 15 November 2021 on Surya TV everyday at 9.00 PM IST and aires on-demand through Sun NXT. It stars Rebecca Santhosh and Nithin Jake Joseph in lead roles along with Gayathri Mayura, Uma Nair, Krishna Prabha and Sreelatha Namboothiri in pivotal roles. It is an official remake of Tamil TV series Roja.

Plot

Pooja is raised in an orphanage, Snehasadhanam by her foster-father Vishwanathan and has a sweet, kind disposition. She, in reality, is Anu, the long-lost daughter of Nandagopan and the late Arunima. She was separated from her family following an accident which killed her mother and supposedly her too. The accident was plotted by her paternal uncle, Shankar Ram for inheriting her father's wealth. She comes across her living father, Nandagopan and develops a bond with him, though unaware of their relationship. Arjun, humble despite his wealth, is a leading criminal lawyer. Pooja and Arjun meet several times and develop a mutual dislike for each other due to their contrasting personalities.

Vishwanathan rejects the business offer of Sakshi, a crooked businesswoman who wishes to buy Snehasadanam ashram. To get rid of Vishwanathan, she frames him for the murder of Theja with the help of Priya, another inmate of Snehasadanam. Nandagopan takes up the case. Priya masquerades herself as the long-lost Anu and returns to Nandagopan. Due to Pooja and Priya's varying statements on Theja murder Case, Nandagopan backs off from the case, causing Pooja to look for another lawyer. Pooja attempts to hire Arjun but he backs off citing that his fees is beyond her capacity. 

Arunima's family reunites with fake Anu and decides to get her married to Arjun, who is her cousin. Arjun who loathes love and marriage refuses but eventually has to relent due to the family's pressure. In an attempt to break the marriage, he puts a condition ahead of Pooja to enter a one-year contract marriage with him in return for him acquitting her father without any fees. Without another choice, Pooja accepts the offer. The two get secretly married in a temple on Arjun's engagement day and start pretending like a married couple in front of the family. Priya along with Arjun's aunt, Madhumita, who hates Pooja because of a past incident tries to discredit and endanger Pooja several times but fails in every attempt. Over time, Arjun and Pooja develop a good friendship bond and Arjun falls for Pooja. 

Arjun becomes distraught when he discovers the truth about Sakshi being the mastermind behind the Theja murder case. He reveals to Pooja that Sakshi was the ex-girlfriend of his best friend, Devan who suicided when he discovered Sakshi's evil side. This had implanted a hatred for love relations in Arjun's mind. Pooja and Arjun try to prove Sakshi guilty in the court, but fail. The family starts having suspicions about Priya being the real Anu. However, she clears the confusions with the help of Shankar Ram who teams up with her for financial gains. Pooja also develops romantic feelings for Arjun.

Akhil falls in love with a feisty girl, Sneha and tries to woo her. Meanwhile, his family decides to get him married to Priya.

Cast

Main
Rebecca Santhosh as Pooja / Real Anu 
Nithin Jake Joseph as Adv. Arjun

Recurring
Gayathri Mayura as Priya / Fake Anu 
Uma Nair as Madhuri Anand 
Krishna Prabha as Madhumita (Madhu) 
Sreelatha Namboothiri as Maheshwariyamma 
Jeevan Gopal as Akhil 
Amrutha Nair as Sneha 
Vijayakumari Ramesh as Kanakam 
Tony Antony (2021; 2022-present) / Amith (2022) as Anand 
Shibu Laban as Vasanthan 
Lakshmi Keerthana as Saayu 
Maneesha Jayasingh (2021-22; 2023-present) / Alanteena (2022) as Sakshi 
Mohan Ayroor as Adv. Nandagopan Marar (Nandan) 
Kiran as Georgekutty 
Nandana Thulasi as Jeena 
Dr Jayan as Shankar Raman Marar 
Sethu Lakshmi as Meenakshiyamma 
Raghavan as Sabarmathi Vishwanathan 
Neena Kurup as Arunima 
Sindhu Jacob as Athira 
Pradeep Prabhakhar as Dathan 
Indulekha as Geetha 
Ranjith Raj as Jeevan 
Alif Shah as SP Kiran Kumar IPS 
Sandhya Manoj as Chandra Prabha IPS 
Shanthi Williams as Japan Rajeshwari 
Kochu Preman as Pankajakshan (Panku) 
Subhash Menon as Baiju Senapathi 
Amboori Jayan as Joseph 
Aneesh as Sajan 
Venki as Harichand Theja 
Nancy as Laali/ Sithara 
Subeer Bavu as Sharath 
Satheesh Vettikkavala as Arjun's junior advocate (2021)
Ashraf Pezhumoodu as Commissioner Padmakumar P IPS 
Vinayak as Rahul 
Anu Lakshmi as Shalini 
Sreenath Swaminathan as Musafir 
Fijo Pious as A man who disturbs Pooja (2021)

Guest
Baby Ameya as Young Anu 
Haritha G Nair as Keerthi 
Sindhu Varma as Hema T.K 
Tom Jacob as Mahesh Manjalikulam 
Pala Aravindan as Padmanabhan 
Kalady Omana as Annamma 
Shanthi Krishna as Herself 
 Stephy Leon as Bhavana

Production

Development
The show's launch was planned for April 2021 but was delayed until November due to the COVID-19 pandemic. It was reported in October 2021, that Kaliveedu is an official remake of the popular Tamil soap opera Roja.

Filming
The series is mainly filmed Thiruvananthapuram and its whereabouts.

Casting

Rebecca Santhosh was cast as the protagonist while Nithin Jake Joseph was roped in to play the male lead. Uma Nair confirmed her presence in October 2021. Sreelatha Namboothiri, Tony, Krishna Prabha and Vijayalakshmi were also revealed to be part of the series. Subhash Menon, Mohan Ayroor, Gayathri Mayoora and Jeevan Gopal were also reportedly cast.

Neena Kurup and Baby Ameya made cameo appearances in the first episode. Veterans Sethu Lakshmi, Kochu Preman and Raghavan also featured in the show. 

In July 2022, Shanthi Krishna played a cameo appearance as herself. In July 2022, actress Stephy Leon as Bhavana from TV series Bhavana made an entry.

Release
The first promotional video of Kaliveedu featuring lead actress Rebecca Santhosh was released in September 2021. The show premiered on Surya TV on 15 November 2021. It is telecasted every day at the 9:00 p.m. (IST) time slot. On the digital platform, Kaliveedu is available for viewing on the app Sun NXT.

Soundtrack

Reception

The show received positive response from the audience.

Critical response
Reviewing the first episode of the show for The Times of India, Radhika Nair thought the show had an "Interesting storyline but lacked lustre". She further wrote: "the show lacks an X-factor to leave the telly audiences wanting for more".

Adaptations

Awards

References

External links
 Official website 
 

Indian drama television series
Indian television soap operas
Indian television series
Malayalam-language television shows
2021 Indian television series debuts
Surya TV original programming
Malayalam-language television series based on Tamil-language television series